Paweł Kryszałowicz (born 23 June 1974) is a Polish former professional footballer who played as a striker. He represented Poland in 33 matches scoring ten goals. A highlight of his career was the participation and goal scored in the World Cup 2002.

Career statistics
Scores and results list Poland's goal tally first, score column indicates score after each Kryszałowicz goal.

References

External links
 

Living people
1974 births
Sportspeople from Słupsk
Polish footballers
Association football forwards
Poland international footballers
2002 FIFA World Cup players
Ekstraklasa players
Bundesliga players
2. Bundesliga players
Gryf Słupsk players
Zawisza Bydgoszcz players
Amica Wronki players
Eintracht Frankfurt players
Wisła Kraków players
SV Wilhelmshaven players
Polish expatriate footballers
Expatriate footballers in Germany
Polish expatriate sportspeople in Germany